The Jewish National Front (Hazit Yehudit LeUmit), commonly known in Israel by its Hebrew acronym, Hayil, is a religious far-right political party in Israel.

History
The party was founded in January 2004 by Baruch Marzel. The party ran in the 2006 elections to the Knesset on a joint list with Professor Paul Eidelberg's Yamin Yisrael party, but received less than the 2% minimum number of votes required to pass the threshold to receive representation.

Marzel was a senior activist for Kach, the most right-wing stream of religious nationalism in Israel, though Marzel was number two on Kleiner's Herut list for the 2003 Knesset elections.

In 2008, prior to the elections for the 18th Knesset, the party merged with Eretz Yisrael Shelanu, which, in turn, joined with the larger National Union party. Jewish National Front representative Michael Ben-Ari was given the fourth spot on the list, and subsequently won a seat in the 18th Knesset in 2009. This marks the first time the Jewish National Front enjoyed Knesset representation.

Ben-Ari was its chairman in 2018 and 2019 until banned from running in that year's election and Itamar Ben-Gvir became chairman.

Position
The party calls for a change in the country's electoral system so that Knesset members represent constituencies, rather than being elected on a party list system, as well as switching to a presidential system of government.

It also supports preserving Israel as a Jewish state by increasing Jewish immigration, limiting immigration of people who are not Jews according to Halakha, and strengthening Jewish education in public schools, and is against territorial compromise, citing the stance of Rabbi Chaim Zimmerman, who wrote a halakhic discourse entitled "The Prohibition of Abandoning Land in Eretz Yisrael".

Election results

See also 
 Neo-Zionism

References

External links 
 Official website

Far-right politics in Israel
Defunct political parties in Israel
Political parties established in 2004
2004 establishments in Israel
Orthodox Jewish political parties
Far-right political parties in Israel
Religious Zionist political parties in Israel
Political parties disestablished in 2012
2012 disestablishments in Israel
Kahanism